Wyndrush Pastures is a Site of Special Scientific Interest (or SSSI) south-east of the village of Redberth, just south of the A477, and around  to the north-west of the coastal town of Tenby in Pembrokeshire, South Wales. It has been designated as a Site of Special Scientific Interest since October 1999 in an attempt to protect its fragile biological elements.

Type
This site is designated due to its biological qualities. SSSIs in Wales have been notified for a total of 142 different animal species and 191 different plant species.

It is of special interest for its areas of neutral and marshy grassland communities, which are set amongst areas of broadleaved woodland, interspersed with smaller areas of dry acidic grassland and tall-herb fen.

See also
List of Sites of Special Scientific Interest in Pembrokeshire

References

External links
Natural Resources Wales website

Sites of Special Scientific Interest in Pembrokeshire